Krzysztof Tołwiński (born 28 February 1968 in Siemiatycze) is a Polish agrarian politician, farmer, and former deputy minister of the treasury from September to November 2007.
In 2010 he became a deputy in the Sejm from the Białystok constituency. He replaced Krzysztof Putra who died in the Smolensk air disaster. He ran for election in 2019 starting from the Confederation list but was not elected. He was a candidate in the 2019–20 Confederation presidential primary.

References

External links
Otwarte Prawybory Prezydenckie Konfederacji Wolność i Niepodległość

Law and Justice politicians
People from Siemiatycze County
1968 births
Living people